Kirk Franklin Presents 1NC is a studio album by Kirk Franklin with the One Nation Crew. It was released on August 15, 2000. It is the first to be released after the retirement of The Family.

Synopsis
Kirk Franklin Presents 1NC is the 6th album released by Kirk Franklin. This is also the first album by Franklin on B-Rite Records, and his first (and only) album released in collaboration with 1NC. The U.S. release occurred on August 15, 2000.

Track listing

References

2000 albums
Kirk Franklin albums